Woodcroft is a suburb of Sydney, in the state of New South Wales, Australia. Woodcroft is located 37 kilometres west of the Sydney central business district, in the local government area of the City of Blacktown and is part of the Greater Western Sydney region. Woodcroft Lake is on Bricketwood Drive and the Neighbourhood Centre is beside it. It is popular among the community. The suburb contains many play areas.

History
From 1969 to 1988 Woodcroft was the State Brickworks in Doonside (and prior to 1969 it was the location of the State Timberworks). In 1989, the land was purchased by estate agents and developers LJ Hooker. After rezoning, residential construction commenced in 1992 and Woodcroft was formally recognized as a suburb in 1996.

Commercial area
There is a modest independent retail mall on Richmond Road. Services include a service station, supermarket, doctor's surgery, and a variety of independent and franchise fast food outlets.

Facilities such as disabled toilets, parenting rooms, and children's play areas, are limited.

Transport
The Blacktown Social Plan shows that Woodcroft households are much more likely to have one car than is usual across both the city of Blacktown, and the Sydney greater metropolitan area. However they are also much less likely to have two or more cars than is usual. This is somewhat of an indication of the transport connections throughout the area and the demographic of the population.

Access to public transport is somewhat limited, being via bus to either Blacktown, Doonside or Quakers Hill railway stations. Most households have one car.

The M7 motorway is accessible to Woodcroft via either the Richmond Road or Quakers Hill Parkway. Since it opened in December 2005 this has improved access to the Hills District, Liverpool and providing connections to both the M2 and M4 motorways.

Housing
The predominant form of housing throughout the suburb is free standing single homes; no residences are apartments and 19.0% are townhouses, semi-detached or similar. This modern, low density housing is a reflection of the standard of living throughout the suburb. A number of streets in Woodcroft are named after well known Australian lakes for example Burrinjuck Drive is named after Burrinjuck Dam and Burragorang street names after lake Burragorang

Landmarks

Woodcroft Lake
Woodcroft features a small man-made lake called Woodcroft Lake, on the area of a former Brick Pit. Each year, in September, the lake and surrounding park is home to the Woodcroft Festival.

Woodcroft Neighbourhood Centre
In 2019, a new Neighbourhood Centre designed by Carter Williamson Architects was opened. It replaced the previous neighbourhood centre which was destroyed by a fire in 2015.

Population
The Blacktown Social Plan indicates that between 1996 and 2001 census, the population increased from 1683 to 4969 people, an increase of over 195%. This is linked directly to the level of residential development occurring throughout the 1990s. This had fallen slightly to 21.1% in 2016.

The Blacktown Social Plan shows that compared to the averages across both the City of Blacktown, and the Sydney greater metropolitan area, residents of Woodcroft are more likely to be English literate migrants, working in white collar jobs. They are also very likely to be buying their own house and to be living as a couple with children.

Since there are relatively sparse retail services here, the majority of residents are more likely to work and shop in nearby city centres such as Blacktown, Parramatta or Penrith. Due to an influx of professionals in the last couple of years together with excellent train connectivity via surrounding train stations, many people travel to Sydney for work.

References

Suburbs of Sydney
City of Blacktown
Populated places established in 1996
1996 establishments in Australia